Pia Zadora (born Pia Alfreda Schipani; May 4, 1954) is an American actress and singer. After working as a child actress on Broadway, in regional theater, and in the film Santa Claus Conquers the Martians (1964), she came to national attention in 1981 when, following her starring role in the highly criticized Butterfly, she won a Golden Globe Award as New Star of the Year while simultaneously winning the Golden Raspberry Award for Worst Actress and the Worst New Star for the same performance.

When in the 1980s Zadora's film career failed to achieve critical success, she switched her focus to music. As a singer, Zadora has released several albums featuring popular standards, often backed by a symphonic orchestra. She was nominated for a Grammy in 1984.

Early life
Zadora was born Pia Alfreda Schipani in Hoboken, New Jersey. Her father, Alphonse Schipani, was an Italian-American violinist, and her mother, Saturnina Schipani (née Zadorowski), was a Polish-American theatrical wardrobe supervisor for Broadway productions, the Metropolitan Opera and the New York City Opera.

She adapted part of her mother's maiden name as her stage name. Zadora appeared as a child actress with Tallulah Bankhead in Midgie Purvis. She played the youngest sister (Bielke) in the Broadway production of Fiddler on the Roof (1964–66).

Career

Film
Zadora's first film role was Girmar, a young Martian girl, in 1964's Santa Claus Conquers the Martians, widely regarded as one of the worst films ever made.

Zadora's acting career made little headway until, while touring with a musical production in 1972, she met Meshulam Riklis, 30 years her senior. The couple married on September 18, 1977. Not long after her marriage, Zadora had a breakthrough as the Dubonnet Girl, appearing in print and television commercials for the apéritif wine, in whose American distributor Riklis was a shareholder. Zadora starred alongside Stacy Keach and Orson Welles in the 1982 film of James M. Cain's novel Butterfly, the plot for which involved father–daughter incest. The musical score featured Zadora singing "It's Wrong for Me to Love You." She won that year's Golden Globe Award as Best New Star of the Year amid charges that Riklis had purchased the award with a promotional campaign that included Zadora's image presented prominently on Sunset Boulevard billboards, an appearance in Playboy magazine, and entertaining Golden Globe voters. Most critics, however, responded negatively to Zadora's performance (for example, The New York Times film critic Vincent Canby described Zadora's performance in the film as "spectacularly inept"), and she received the 1982 Razzies awards for both Worst New Star and Worst Actress.

Zadora next starred in the 1982 film Fake-Out, also called Nevada Heat, a women in prison B-movie comedy co-starring Telly Savalas and Desi Arnaz Jr. In 1983 she appeared in the film adaptation of the Harold Robbins novel The Lonely Lady, portraying an aspiring screenwriter who achieves success after surviving sexual assault. For this performance she received the 1983 Golden Raspberry Award for Worst Actress. On the basis of being multiply recognized by the Golden Raspberry Awards, Zadora was named Worst New Star of the Decade (1980–89) and nominated as Worst Actress of the 1980s.

In 1985, Zadora starred as the object of an extraterrestrial's affections in the musical comedy Voyage of the Rock Aliens. In addition to displaying her comedic side, the film showcased her musical talents and featured half of the songs from her 1984 album Let's Dance Tonight. In 1988 she appeared as a beatnik in John Waters's film Hairspray, about which the film critic Roger Ebert wrote "If nothing else is worth the price of admission to this movie, perhaps you will be persuaded by the prospect of Zadora reading from Allen Ginsberg's Howl."

In 2000, Zadora was nominated at the 20th Golden Raspberry Awards as Worst Actress of the Century, ultimately losing to Madonna.

Music
Although as an actress, Zadora's performances have generated critical hostility, she has attained greater critical success as a singer. Zadora's cover of the Shirley Ellis hit "The Clapping Song," recorded for the film score of The Lonely Lady in 1983, reached the U.S. top 40 (her only Top 40 hit on the Billboard Hot 100), and in 1984 she had a hit duet with Jermaine Jackson titled "When the Rain Begins to Fall" from the movie Voyage of the Rock Aliens. In 1985, she received a nomination for a Grammy Award for Best Female Rock Vocal Performance for the song "Rock It Out," losing to Tina Turner's "Better Be Good to Me." Also in 1985, Zadora released Pia & Phil, an album of standards with the London Philharmonic Orchestra, and recorded a follow-up album in 1986 titled I Am What I Am.

In 1988, Zadora worked with producers Jimmy Jam and Terry Lewis on an album titled When the Lights Go Out. The album was released only in Europe, and the single "Dance Out of My Head" did not chart despite the top producers and club remixes by Shep Pettibone and Ben Liebrand. In 1989, Zadora recorded the album Pia Z with producer Narada Michael Walden; this album also failed to chart. The single "Heartbeat of Love" included club remixes by Robert Civillés and David Cole of C+C Music Factory. Pia Today! (1988) and Only for Romantics (1991), two additional albums/CDs of standards, received only limited promotional release. Pia—The Platinum Collection, a three-CD compilation, was released in 1993 and sold in the United States via infomercials. The album included repackaged versions of Pia & Phil, I Am What I Am, and Pia Today!.

In 1994, Zadora had a cameo appearance in the comedy Naked Gun : The Final Insult. In her segment of the film, Zadora performed the Steve Allen–penned "This Could Be the Start of Something Big" during a parody of an Academy Awards musical number.

According to her website, in 2020 Zadora released a new album featuring American standards, entitled All or Nothing At All.

Cabaret
In 2011, Zadora began a small attempt at a comeback with a cabaret show titled Pia Zadora: Back Again, and Standing Tall. In February, she performed at the Eissey Campus Theatre in Palm Beach Gardens, Florida and the Kaye Auditorium in Boca Raton. She took the show to The Rrazz Room in San Francisco on June 8 where it ran for five performances until June 12. 
Zadora appeared at San Francisco's Rrazz Room's 3rd annual Rrazziversary Gala Celebration and Benefit for St. Jude Children's Research Hospital on March 17, 2011, and at the Nevada Children's Center's Great Gatsby Gala on April 3, 2011.

In 2012, Zadora performed with the Desert Symphony Orchestra at the McCallum Theatre in Palm Desert, California, and appeared on the TV show Celebrity Ghost Stories.

Since 2013, Zadora has hosted and performed Pia's Place at Las Vegas restaurant Piero's Italian Cuisine.

Personal life
Zadora married businessman Meshulam Riklis in 1977, when she was 23, and he was 54. She was a marquee headliner at the Riviera Hotel in Las Vegas during the early 1970s owing to her association with Riklis and Sinatra. Zadora and Riklis bought the Beverly Hills mansion Pickfair Manor in January 1988 from Los Angeles Lakers owner Jerry Buss for almost US$7 million. They demolished most of the structure while keeping the guest houses, claiming that termites and time had made repairs difficult.

The mansion, which drew its name of Pickfair from having once been the shared home of Douglas Fairbanks and Mary Pickford, was torn down and a new  mansion was built on the property. Zadora later claimed on a September 2012 episode of BIO's Celebrity Ghost Stories that Pickfair was razed owing to a troubling apparition that appeared to her and children when her husband was away on business. Riklis commissioned a nude oil portrait of Zadora, which greeted visitors.

With first husband Riklis, she had children Kady Zadora (born 1985) and Kristofer Barzie (born 1987). Kady was named after Zadora's film character in Butterfly, which later inspired the call letters for station KADY-TV in Oxnard, California, after Riklis acquired it in 1988. After he divested himself of his ownership, it changed its call letters to KBEH.

Zadora and Riklis divorced in 1993, and Zadora remained in the mansion until late 2005 or early 2006, when she sold it to Korean businessman Corry Hong for US$17,650,000.

Zadora's second husband was writer–director Jonathan Kaufer. They were married from August 1995 to November 2001, and had one child, Jordan Maxwell Kaufer. In 2010 a defamation lawsuit brought by Kaufer against Zadora, which alleged that Zadora falsely accused Kaufer of sexually molesting their son, was dismissed because the presiding judge found Zadora's comments to be protected speech.

Zadora has been married to Michael Jeffries, a detective with the Las Vegas Metropolitan Police Department, since 2005 and currently resides in Summerlin, Nevada. Zadora and Jeffries met after Zadora contacted the Las Vegas Police to report a stalking incident.

In June 2013, following an altercation with her teenage son Jordan, Zadora was charged with domestic violence battery and coercion, and jailed after a SWAT team surrounded her home. Zadora, who admitted to drinking alcohol before the incident and confirmed the cause of the altercation, was later ordered by the presiding judge to "stay out of trouble for a year, attend impulse control counseling and follow recommendations of [an] alcohol evaluation."

In September 2014, Zadora was hospitalized in the intensive care unit of University Medical Center of Southern Nevada due to head and leg injuries sustained in a golf cart accident. By December, she was back to work.

Filmography

Film

Television

Theater
The Garden of Sweets (1961)
Midgie Purvis (1961)
A Gift of Time (1962)
We Take the Town (1962)
Fiddler on the Roof (1965)
Henry, Sweet Henry (1967)
Dames at Sea (1968)
Little Mary Sunshine (1970) 
Applause (1972)
Promises, Promises (1973) 
Damn Yankees (1976) 
Funny Girl (1991)
Crazy for You (1995)
Pippin (1995)

Discography

Albums
1982: Pia
1984: Let's Dance Tonight
1985: Pia & Phil
1986: I Am What I Am
1988: When the Lights Go Out
1989: Pia Z
1989: Pia Today! (promo only until it was issued as part of The Platinum Collection)
1993: Only for Romantics (promo only)
1993: The Platinum Collection (included Pia & Phil, I Am What I Am, and Pia Today!)
2020: All Or Nothing At All

Singles

AB-side to "Bedtime Stories"
BB-side to "When the Rain Begins to Fall"

Awards and nominations

Golden Globe Awards
Won: New Star of the Year, Butterfly (1981)

Golden Raspberry Awards
Won: Worst New Star, Butterfly (1983)
Won: Worst Actress, The Lonely Lady (1984)
Won: Worst New Star of the Decade, Butterfly and The Lonely Lady (1990)
Nominated: Worst Actress of the Decade, Butterfly and The Lonely Lady (1990)
Nominated: Worst Actress of the Century, Voyage of the Rock Aliens, Butterfly, and The Lonely Lady (2000)

Golden Apple Award
Won: Sour Apple (1982)

Grammy Awards
Nominated: Best Rock Vocal Performance Female, for "Rock It Out" (1985)

ShoWest Award
Won: Young Star of the Year (1982)

In popular culture
The cult TV series Mystery Science Theater 3000 had riffed her debut film Santa Claus Conquers the Martians as a third season episode.

Her appearance on the aforementioned Hairspray was referenced on an earlier episode of MST3K, this time First Spaceship on Venus.

References

External links

1954 births
Living people
Actresses from New Jersey
American child actresses
American dance musicians
American film actresses
American people of Italian descent
American people of Polish descent
American women country singers
American women pop singers
American stage actresses
American television actresses
Singers from New Jersey
New Star of the Year (Actress) Golden Globe winners
Musicians from Hoboken, New Jersey
Traditional pop music singers
Songwriters from New Jersey
People from Summerlin, Nevada
Country musicians from New York (state)
Country musicians from New Jersey
21st-century American women